Harry Groener (born September 10, 1951) is a German-born American actor and dancer, perhaps best known for playing Mayor Wilkins in Buffy the Vampire Slayer (seasons 3, 4 and 7).

Early life
Groener was born in Augsburg, Bavaria, West Germany, to an opera singer mother and a father who worked as a concert pianist, office clerk, and composer. He immigrated to the United States with his family at the age of two. As a teenager, Groener was apprenticed at the San Francisco Ballet; he went on to study drama at the University of Washington.

Career

Groener's reputation in New York City rests almost entirely on his work in musical theater. However, the bulk of his roles outside New York have been in classical drama or contemporary plays like Eastern Standard. His Broadway credits include Is There Life After High School?, Will Parker in Oklahoma! (Tony Award nomination, Theatre World Award), Munkustrap in Cats (Tony Award nomination), Georges/George in Sunday in the Park with George, and Bobby Child in Crazy for You (Tony Award and Outer Critics Circle Award nominations). 

In 1999, he performed off-Broadway with Twiggy at the Lucille Lortel Theater in If Love Were All, a musical revue based on the friendship of Noël Coward and Gertrude Lawrence. He has performed in regional theatres across the country, including the San Diego Old Globe Theatre (where he is an associate artist), Mark Taper Forum, Westwood Playhouse, South Coast Repertory, Pasadena Playhouse, Long Wharf Theater, A.C.T., and the Williamstown Theater Festival.

Groener has performed regularly on TV, including guest appearances on Star Trek: The Next Generation (1990), Star Trek: Voyager (1996), Star Trek: Enterprise (2005) and several dozen other series; he was also a series regular on the sitcom Dear John. In 1998-99, he portrayed Richard Wilkins, the evil mayor of Sunnydale on the third season of cult TV series Buffy the Vampire Slayer and reprised the role in cameo appearances in Buffy's 4th and 7th seasons. 

From 2003 to 2006, he appeared as the chef Gunther on the TV series Las Vegas. Notable film work includes Road to Perdition and About Schmidt. He also appeared in two episodes of The West Wing as the Secretary of Agriculture and the Bones episode "The Woman at the Airport" as a plastic surgeon, Henry Atlas. In 2009, Groener appeared in the second season episode of Breaking Bad, "Bit by a Dead Bee", as protagonist Walter White's psychiatrist. He also portrayed Clint's role, Ted's stepdad, in How I Met Your Mother. In January 2018, Groener appeared in an episode of Young Sheldon.

He was a regular vocalist for the Varèse Sarabande label, performing on such recordings as Shakespeare on Broadway, Cole Porter: A Musical Toast, and various installments of the Unsung Broadway and Lost in Boston series. He played King Arthur in Monty Python's Spamalot during 2006. In 2010, he appeared as the title role in the Antaeus Company's production of King Lear. He won the L.A. Drama Critics Circle Award for this performance. In 2012, he starred in the debut of Christopher Hampton's play Appomattox at the Guthrie Theater in Minneapolis, playing a dual role as both U.S. presidents Abraham Lincoln in 1865 and Lyndon B. Johnson in 1965. He currently serves as an honorary board member at the Alpine Theater Project in Whitefish, MT.

Filmography

Film

Television

Stage

Awards and nominations

References

External links

 
 

1951 births
American male dancers
American male film actors
American male stage actors
American male television actors
German emigrants to the United States
Living people
Male actors from San Francisco
University of Washington School of Drama alumni
20th-century American dancers
21st-century American dancers